John or Jon Bryant may refer to:

Academia and science
John B. Bryant (1947–2020), American economist
John Collins Bryant (1821–1901), American physician, author and college co-founder
John Harland Bryant (1925–2017), American physician
John Henry Bryant (1825–1903), medical doctor and member of the Los Angeles Common Council

Arts and entertainment
John Delavau Bryant (1811–1877), American poet and physician
John Bryant (harpist) (1832–1926), Welsh harpist
John Bryant (journalist) (1943–2020), British journalist and marathon founder
Jon Bryant (born 1986), Canadian singer-songwriter
John Bryant (actor) (1916–1989) American actor of stage, film, and television

Government and politics
John Bryant (Oklahoma politician) (c. 1958–2011), American politician
John Emory Bryant (1836–1900), American politician in Georgia
John Hope Bryant (born 1966), author, poverty eradication activist
John R. Bryant, state legislator in North Carolina 
John Wiley Bryant (born 1947), American politician in Texas

Sports
John Bryant (basketball) (born 1987), American basketball player
John Bryant (journalist) (1944–2020), British marathon founder
John Bryant (sailor) (born 1930), American Olympic sailor
John Bryant (sport shooter) (1930–2010), Australian Olympic shooter
Jon Bryant (rugby union) (born 1976), Welsh rugby union player

Others
John A. Bryant, Australian businessman, former Chairman and CEO of Kellogg Company
John Richard Bryant (born 1946), bishop of the African Methodist Episcopal Church
John W. Bryant (born 1949), leader of the Mormon fundamentalist sect Church of Christ Patriarchal